Lázár Szentes (born 12 December 1955) is a former Hungarian football player of the 1970s and 1980s. He appeared at the 1982 FIFA World Cup with the Hungarian national team. Between 1982 and 1983 he played 6 games and scored 3 goals for Hungary.

References

Sources
 Ki kicsoda a magyar sportéletben?, III. kötet (S–Z). Szekszárd, Babits Kiadó, 1995, 147. o., 
NS online profile 

1955 births
Living people
People from Bonyhád
Sportspeople from Tolna County
Hungarian footballers
Hungary international footballers
1982 FIFA World Cup players
Zalaegerszegi TE players
Győri ETO FC players
Vitória F.C. players
Louletano D.C. players
C.D.R. Quarteirense players
Association football forwards
Hungarian expatriate footballers
Expatriate footballers in Portugal
Hungarian expatriate sportspeople in Portugal
Hungarian football managers
Győri ETO FC managers
Szombathelyi Haladás football managers
Debreceni VSC managers
Zalaegerszegi TE managers
Újpest FC managers
Nyíregyháza Spartacus FC managers
Diósgyőri VTK managers
Ittihad FC managers
Nemzeti Bajnokság I managers
Hungarian expatriate football managers
Expatriate football managers in Saudi Arabia
Hungarian expatriate sportspeople in Saudi Arabia